Prey is a television crime thriller first broadcast on ITV, 28 April 2014 at 9pm. ITV first announced the new commission on their official Twitter account on 23 August 2013. A second series was announced in April 2015 and began airing on 9 December 2015.

Storylines

Series 1
The first story stars John Simm as Detective Constable Marcus Farrow, a well-liked detective with the fictional Manchester Metropolitan Police and an ex-husband with two children. His life falls apart when he finds his ex-wife and one of his sons murdered, and all the evidence points to him. Discovered at the scene of the crime, Marcus is arrested, but later escapes and goes on-the-run, determined to find who killed his family, and why.

Series 2
The story stars Philip Glenister as Prison Officer David Murdoch. His life becomes very complicated when, on a routine visit to a Manchester hospital with female prisoner Jules Hope, events spiral out of control. David receives a cell phone call from his pregnant daughter Lucy, who has been kidnapped, pleading for him to take his prisoner Jules offsite to a meet, otherwise Lucy will be killed. He does so, and instantly sees himself on the wrong side of the law.

Filming for the second series began in May 2015, before screening from 9–23 December 2015.

Series overview

Main cast
 Rosie Cavaliero – DS Susan Reinhart (Series 1 and 2)

Series 1
 John Simm – DS Marcus Farrow 
 Adrian Edmondson – Assistant Chief Constable Warner
 Benedict Wong – DS Ashley Chan 
 Anastasia Hille – DCI Andrea MacKenzie 
 Craig Parkinson – DI Sean Devlin 
 Ray Emmet Brown – Tony Reinhardt
 Daniel Jillings - DC Gibbons
 Struan Rodger – Topher Lomax 
 Brian Vernel – Dale Lomax

Series 2
 Philip Glenister – David Murdoch
 MyAnna Buring – Jules Hope 
 Nathan Stewart-Jarrett – DC Richard Iddon 
 Ralph Ineson – DCI Mike Ward 
 Daniel Jillings - DC Will Gibbons 
 Sammy Winward – Lucy Murdoch
 Kieran O'Brien – Phil Prentice
 Mariama Bojang - PC Smith

Episodes

Series 1 (2014)

Series 2 (2015)

Awards and nominations
John Simm won a Royal Television Society North West Award for "Best Male Performance" in the first series of Prey. The series was also nominated for a 2015 BAFTA Television Award in the category "Mini Series".

References

External links
 

2010s British drama television series
2014 British television series debuts
2015 British television series endings
British drama television series
2010s British television miniseries
English-language television shows
ITV television dramas
Television shows set in Manchester
2010s British crime television series
Television series by Red Production Company